More Soul is an album by jazz saxophonist Hank Crawford. Atlantic Records released the album in 1961.  More Soul is Crawford's first album as a leader, recorded on October 7, 1960 while he was the music director in Ray Charles' group.  Charles provided the arrangement for the track "The Story."

Critical reception 

Thom Jurek of allmusic gives the album a three-and-a-half star rating (of a possible five), noting that "[t]he material is swinging, front-ended, soul-inflected hard bop with tunes arranged by Crawford" and that "Crawford's tone as a soloist is sweet yet edgy and raw, full of emotion and warmth." The Penguin Guide to Jazz describes the album as "sonorous and churchy in the Brother Ray mode…" and gives the album a three-star rating (of a possible four).

In 1961, Ralph Gleason, in a review for Down Beat, gave the album five stars.

Track listing 
All titles arranged by Hank Crawford, except where indicated.

Personnel 
 Hank Crawford – alto saxophone, piano
 David "Fathead" Newman – tenor saxophone
 Leroy "Hog" Cooper – baritone saxophone
 Phillip Guilbeau – trumpet
 John Hunt – flugelhorn, trumpet
 Edgar Willis – bass
 Milt Turner – drums

Production 
 Nesuhi Ertegun – producer
 Tom Dowd – engineer
 Phil Iehle – engineer
 Gary Kramer – liner notes
 Lee Friedlander – photography
 Loring Eutemey – cover design

References 

 

Hank Crawford albums
1960 albums
Atlantic Records albums
Albums produced by Nesuhi Ertegun
Soul jazz albums
Hard bop albums